Gavar (also known as Jevar, Jowr, and Jūr) is a village in Javar Rural District, in the Central District of Kuhbanan County, Kerman Province, Iran. At the 2006 census, its population was 1,519, in 418 families.

References 

Populated places in Kuhbanan County